Terellia blanda is a species of tephritid or fruit flies in the genus Terellia of the family Tephritidae.

Distribution
Mongolia.

References

Tephritinae
Insects described in 1975
Diptera of Asia